Prague 18 is a municipal district (městská část) in Prague. It is located in the north-eastern part of the city. It is formed by one cadastre Letňany. As of 2008, there were 16,433 inhabitants living in Prague 18.

The administrative district (správní obvod) of the same name consists of municipal districts Prague 18 and Čakovice.

External links 
 Prague 18 - Letňany - Official homepage

Districts of Prague